The 2007–08 División de Honor Juvenil de Fútbol season was the 22nd since its establishment.

Regular season

Copa de Campeones

Group A

Group B

1st round

2nd round

Final

Details

External links
 Royal Spanish Football Federation website

2007–08
Juvenil